Verulux solmaculata, the sunspot cardinalfish, is a species of ray-finned fish from the cardinalfish family Apogonidae. It was first described in 2016 and it occurs in the Timor Sea off New Guinea and northern Western Australia. It is a small, almost transparent cardinalfish which has three black stripes on the anterior part of the body one from the tip of the snout to the front of the eye, one from the preopercular margin to the middle of the operculum, and one from the back edge of the eye to the angle of the preoperculum. It can be distinguished from its only congener, Verulux cypselurus, by there being an obvious black blotch at the base of the caudal fin, while this is lacking in V. cypselurus, and in having a, a broader black longitudinal band on each caudal fin lobe which covers 3–5 rays in this species as compared to  1–3 rays in V. cypselurus. This species also has a photophore below the posterior edge of the gill opening.

References

solmaculata
Fish described in 2016